The 2nd Hum Awards ceremony, presented by the Hum Television Network and Entertainment Channel (HTNEC), sponsored by Servis and Telenor Talkshawlk, honored the best in fashion, music and Hum Television Dramas of 2013. The ceremony took place on 29 March 2014 at Expo Center in Karachi, Sindh beginning at 7:30 PST. The ceremony was recorded and was broadcast on 25 May 2014. During the ceremony, Hum Television Network and Entertainment Channel presented awards in 29 regular categories along with 2 in honorary and 1 in special category. The ceremony was televised in Pakistan by Hum TV, while Servis returned as a main sponsor of the show.

Television personalities Meekal Zulfiqar and Sanam Saeed hosted the show along with Sanam Jung and Vasay Chaudhry. Meekal Zulfiqar and Vasay Chaudhry hosted the show for a second time, having hosted the previous ceremony. During the ceremony, Hum also held its annual Honorary Awards, which were presented by host Fahad Mustafa.

Zindagi Gulzar Hai won nine awards, the most for the ceremony, including Best Director Drama Serial for Sultana Siddiqui and Best Drama Serial Jury and Best Drama Serial Popular for Momina Duraid. Aseerzadi won three awards including Best Actress and Best Supporting Actor, for Sania Saeed and Salman Shahid respectively. Dil-e-Muztar and Ek Pagal Si Larki won two awards each. While others dramas to win one award were Rehaai, Ishq Humari Galion Main, Extras – The Mango People, Rishtay Kuch Adhorey Se, Behadd and Ullu Baraye Farokht Nahi.

Winners and nominees

The nominees of the 2nd Hum Awards were announced on 2 March 2014 at the bloggers meeting by GM Public Relations and Publications Shehnaz Ramzi, In meeting, only four categories were announced which were set open for public voting on channels official website, while the rest of the categories were announced during the ceremony. Television categories were split into Viewers Choice and Jury Choice portions. Zindagi Gulzar Hai, Aseerzadi and Dil-e-Muztar tied for the most nominations with thirteen each, and Zindagi Gulzar Hai bags nine awards in all of its nominations.

Noman Ejaz and Samina Peerzada became the second time winner of Best Actor and Best Supporting Actress awards, respectively. Sania Saeed and Salman Shahid wins in the Best Actress and Best Supporting Actor categories respectively made Aseerzadi the second drama to win both leading acting awards. Umera Ahmad won Best Writer Drama Serial for Zindagi Gulzar Hai, which was her second successive win. Umera was the only individual whose work were nominated in all main categories, including Best Actor and Best Actress (Viewers/Jury), Best Supporting Actor/Actress, and Best Television Film which ultimately won for director Asim Raza.

Sanam Saeed and Fawad Khan won the Best Actress Popular and Best Actor Popular receptively. Fawad and Sanam won both Jury and Viewers Choice category of Best Onscreen Couple. Arij Fatyma was the only soap actress to be nominated consecutive for Best Soap Actress and ultimately won. Momina Duraid, Fawad Khan, Sanam Saeed and Noman Ejaz were the only individuals to win multiple awards, with two trophies each.

Awards

Winners are listed first and highlighted in boldface.

Television

Music

Fashion

Honorary Hum Awards 

The Hum presented its honorary awards during the ceremony by holding the tradition of honoring the extravagant works of artists across the country. During the ceremony two Hum Honorary Awards and Lifetime Achievement Award were presented.

Hum Honorary Lifetime Achievement Award 

 Zia Mohyeddin

Hum Honorary Award in Television 

 Bushra Ansari

Hum Honorary Special recognition 

Special Hum trophies were presented by Hum Television Network and Entertainment Channel to Bilal Lashari and Humayun Saeed for their record breaking success of films which helps the revival of Pakistani Cinema after a period.

 Bilal Lashari – Waar
 Humayun Saeed – Main Hoon Shahid Afridi

Dramas with multiple nominations and awards 

The following 14 dramas received multiple nominations:

The following four dramas received multiple awards:

Presenters and performers

Presenters (in order of appearance) 

The following individuals were chosen to present awards:

Performers 

The following individuals were chosen to perform musical numbers:

Ceremony information
Television personality Mikaal Zulfiqar and Sanam Saeed hosted the show, with co-host Vasay Chaudhry and Sanam Jung. Mikal and Vasay Hosted the show for a second time after hosting the 1st ceremony in 2013. Vasay and Mikaal, while hosting of show, utilized improv comedy, holding an impromptu session of question answers and criticizing others actors and celebrities. Show held its red carpet event modernizing it by giving the official name of Interactive Lounge #humawards2014. Presenters Waqar Ali Khan and Sarwat Gillani posed for an impromptu photo (selfie) facing their back to the audience.

Winners were announced during the awards ceremony on 29 March 2014. Momina Duraid became the first producer to win an Hum trophy for second time for Best Drama Serial, while Sultana Siddiqui became the oldest and first female recipient to win Best Director Drama Serial. Sultana returned to directing after a gap of almost ten years. Rehaai was second in the race of most nominations with twelve, but lost all accept for Best Acting category. Out of thirteen nominations Dil-e-Muztar only won two awards including Best Original Soundtrack for Alycia Dias and Best Television Sensation to Sanam Jung. Ullu Baraye Farokht Nahi was among with those dramas who have won only one award having most nominations. Fawad Khan, Sanam Saeed, Sania Saeed Sanam Baloch, saba Qamar, Fahad Mustafa, Noman Ejaz, Adnan Siddiqui, Mikaal Zulfiqar and Ahsan Khan bagged consecutive Best Actor and Best Actress nominations for this year ceremony too. Momina Duraid was the only individual to be nominated twelve times as a producer, most nominations for the ceremony. Samina Peerzada and Yumna Zaidi were the only individuals to be nominated for both Best Actress and Best Supporting Actress category. Compared to last year nominations, the ceremony nominated only nine dramas and all competition was mostly among these nominated dramas.

In the Viewer's Choice categories, Zindagi Gulzar Hai won all awards, Including Best Actor and Best Actress Viewers choice. In Fashion, Deepak Perwani and Emran Rajput bags the consecutive nominations for Best Designer Womenswear and Best Designer Menswear respectively consecutive this year too. Ayyan Ali, Rabia Butt, Fouzia Aman and Abbas Jafri, Omer Shehzad, Muhammad Mubarik Ali were all nominated second time for Best Model Female and Best Model Male respectively. In the music category, Falak and Abbas Ali Khan were nominated second time as Best Solo Artist while Usman Mukhtar was nominated as a producer for Best Music Video for second time.

Broadcasting
Hum Awards supervene its first ceremony, organizing the event off-air on 29 March 2014 and started broadcasting after passing through the censorship criteria of Pakistan Censor Board on 25 May 2014.

Making of Awards
Hum Awards Making is the part of award ceremony in which stage creation of the show, rehearsals of performances, and miscellaneous happenings related to show were shown. This is an off-and-on program which is not a compulsory event to be shown, unlike the Red Carpet. Making of Awards was hosted by television personalities Anoushey Ashraf and Mansha Pasha.

The Hum Awards Red carpet was arranged in the foyer area which was furbished with white couches that were complemented by a backdrop of glass-work and bright lights with soothing music by Wahab Shah. Nazeer Saeed Janjua served as director and producer for a second time while Umer Mukhtar and S. Ommar Rehman served as the assistant director, Umer Mukhtar as co-producer, Saad Ahmed as line producer, Hassan Shirazi as head of transportation, Khair Muhammed as technical director. Choreography was organized by ActOne, while backstage management by was done by Production O21.

Voting trend and summary

Hum Television Network and Entertainment Channel set open four categories called Viewers Choice Categories for public voting from 7 March 2014 to 25 March 2014. Audience could vote and select their favorite actors in categories such as Best Actor, Best Actress, Best Drama Serial and Best Onscreen Couple. Online public voting received an immense reception from people.

The rest of the categories were jury selected and voted by Hum membership as a whole. Jury awards also included Best Actor, Best Actress, Best Couple and Best Drama Serial, while Fashion and Music categories were completely based on membership votes.

Awards categories
Compared to first ceremony, 2nd Hum Awards had some changes in the categories awarded. Some of the previous years categories were not awarded while others were introduced.

Category split
With the inception of Award Ceremony in 2013, both Jury and Viewers Choice categories were present but didn't mention and carried out specifically. For 2nd ceremony, Television categories was split in two section Jury Choice Categories and Viewers Choice Categories, Jury Categories comprises total of sixteen television categories, while Viewers Choice contains only Four popular categories, all viewers categories were also included in Jury i.e.; Best Actor Viewers choice and Best Actor Jury Choice. Similarly in Fashion and Music all categories were Viewers choice based.

Criteria of categories were introduced to avoid biased reception from audience and critics. Thus introducing the interference of Public in selection process shows the respect and devotion for public. While Fashion and Music categories were awarded same as did in first ceremony.

Not awarded categories
Having many changes in the event, main change was awarding categories, as compared to first ceremony which follow the simple categories criteria in Fashion, Music and Television. This year following categories were not awarded:

 Hum Award for Best Drama Series 
 Hum Award for Best Television Host
 Hum Award for Best Comic Actor

The dis-closer of these categories were not explained and not mention.

Newly introduced categories

As with the removal of some categories new categories were introduced in Television and Music Categories. In Television following categories were introduced:

 Hum Award for Best Actor in a Negative Role
 Hum Award for Best or Most Impactful Character
 Hum Award for Best Television Film

While in Music only one category was introduced

 Hum Award for Best Music Band

Changes had wholly been made by Hum management and membership as a whole.

Special awarded categories

Pakistan Film Industry shows extravagant achievement and progress in 2013, such effort has earned a great reputation to boost-up the lost Pakistani Film Industry. Many Television Directors, producers and writers were tuned up to Silver screen, and year 2013 has been proved tremendous for film industry, Bilal Lashari’s long-awaited movie Waar broke several records on domestic and international screens, earning critical and financial success. While Humayun Saeed biographical movie Main Hoon Shahid Afridi also achieve financial and critical success, while others independent films like Seedlings, Zinda Bhaag, and Josh: Independence Through Unity were major hits, film Zinda Bhaag was selected as an official entry for Academy Award for Best Foreign Language Film after 50 years which was first done by Aina.  To celebrate such success Hum Television Network and Entertainment Channel honored Humayun Saeed and Bilal Lashari for their exceptional works towards cinema and for the revival of Pakistani Film Industry.

See also

 12th Lux Style Awards
 4th Pakistan Media Awards

References

External links 

 
Official websites
 Hum Awards official website

News resources
 2nd Hum Awards Pakistan Today 
 Hum Awards: Not at all Ho-Hum Dawn News

Analysis
 2nd Hum Awards Event Review Pakistan Ultimate Media
 2nd Hum Awards Review It!

Other resources 
  2nd Hum Awards-Grand Ceremony Pakistan Review 

2013 television awards
2013 music awards
Hum Awards
Hum Award winners
Hum Awards ceremonies